Claude Gamot (born 11 June 1933) is a French sabre fencer. He competed at the 1956 and 1960 Summer Olympics.

References

External links
 

1933 births
Living people
Sportspeople from Lille 
French male sabre fencers
Olympic fencers of France
Fencers at the 1956 Summer Olympics
Fencers at the 1960 Summer Olympics